Cornelia "Cora" Mitchell Downs (December 20, 1892 to January 27, 1987) was an American microbiologist and journalist who completed extensive work in the areas of immunofluorescence and tularemia research. Downs was born and raised in Kansas City, Kansas to parents Lily Louis Campbell Downs and Henry Mitchell Downs and remained there for much of her educational, teaching, and research careers.

Education 
In 1915, Downs completed her Bachelor of Arts degree at the University of Kansas. She continued her education at University of Kansas to complete her Master of Arts degree in 1920, followed by her Doctor of Philosophy in 1924. Downs also attended the University of Chicago to complete her Postgraduate degree in 1921.

Career 
Downs served as an educator in the Department of Bacteriology at the University of Kansas between 1917 and 1963. She taught at the university as an instructor, assistant professor, and associate professor before being appointed full professorship in 1935. During her time at the University of Kansas, Downs conducted groundbreaking microbiology research surrounding the  animal immune responses to tularemia, commonly known as rabbit fever. She is also well known for her work in the development of the fluorescent antibody technique—a diagnostic technique used to identify viruses—by studying methods to simplify the synthesis of the labelling agents used in the procedure. Downs also served as a visiting investigator at the Rockefeller Institute from 1939 to 1940. She ultimately retired in 1963.

Awards and memberships 
Downs was recognized in Marquis Who's Who as a prominent instructor in microbiology. She was also recognized as a member of many scientific organizations including the American Society of Pathology and Bacteriology, the American Association of Immunologists, the  American Association for the Advancement of Science, and the American Association of University Professors. Downs was also a Fellow of the New York Academy of Sciences and a member of several Greek organizations and honor societies including Sigma Xi, Phi Sigma, and Delta Delta Delta.

References 

1892 births
1987 deaths
Scientists from Kansas
People from Kansas City, Kansas
American microbiologists
20th-century American biologists
American women biologists
Women microbiologists
University of Kansas alumni
University of Chicago alumni
University of Kansas faculty
American immunologists
Women immunologists
Place of death missing
20th-century American women
American women academics